Joseph H. McCormick was an American football, basketball, and baseball coach.  He served as the head football at Dickinson College from 1931 to 1934 and at Mount St. Mary's University from 1937 to 1938, compiling a career college football record of 15–24–7.  McCormick was also the head basketball coach at Mount St. Mary's for the 1937–38 season, tallying a 12–2 mark.  McCormick graduated from Colby College in 1915.

Coaching career
McCormick was the 22nd head football coach at Dickinson College in Carlisle, Pennsylvania. He held that position for four seasons, from 1931 until 1934, compiling a record of 10–16–6. Highlights included a 10–6 victory in 1931 over Penn State.

References

Year of birth missing
Year of death missing
Dickinson Red Devils baseball coaches
Dickinson Red Devils football coaches
Mount St. Mary's Mountaineers football coaches
Mount St. Mary's Mountaineers men's basketball coaches
Colby College alumni